San Nicolas de Tolentino is a parish church in Quezon City. It belongs to the Roman Catholic Diocese of Cubao, under the Vicariate of Sto. Nino.  It is under the care of the Augustinian Recollect Province of Saint Ezequiél Moreno.

The parish was named after San Nicolas de Tolentino, the patron saint of the poor souls in purgatory, whose feast day is celebrated on 10 September. Recollect fathers expanded their apostolate by building a church, which later became the center of a sprawling parish extending from Visayas Avenue in the east, to Mindanao Avenue in the west, from Carmel II in the south to Tandang Sora in the north.

Established on April 30, 1975, it was on May 11, 1975, that Fr. Alejandro Ramirez, OAR, was installed as the first parish priest, with Fr. Antonio Ausejo, OAR, and Fr. Clemente Jubera, OAR, as assistants. In response to the demand of the faithful, the parish was divided in two: Our Father Parish and Our Lady of Annunciation Parish were created within the San Nicholas de Tolentino territory.  The current Parish Priest is Father Niño Cesar R. Ruiz, OAR with estimated population of 10, 000 Catholics.

See also
 Augustinian Recollect Province of Saint Ezequiél Moreno
 List of religious buildings in Metro Manila

References

External links 

 Coordinates:  14°40'20"N 121°2'15"E
 Diocese of Cubao
 Churches in Quezon City
Article about Nicholas from EWTN
Catholic Encyclopedia: St. Nicholas of Tolentino
Patrons Saint Index
Catholic Online Saints: Nicholas of Tolentino
Lives of the Saints, September 10: Saint Nicholas of Tolentino
Life of St. Nicholas of Tolentine - Augustinians of the Midwest

Roman Catholic churches in Quezon City
Churches in the Roman Catholic Diocese of Cubao